Baron Decies, of Decies in the County of Waterford, is a title in the Peerage of Ireland. It was created in 1812 for the Right Reverend William Beresford, Archbishop of Tuam from 1794 to 1819. He was the third son of the Marcus Beresford, 1st Earl of Tyrone, and the younger brother of George Beresford, 1st Marquess of Waterford. His son, the second Baron, married Charlotta Philadelphia Horsley, the only daughter and heiress of Robert Horsley (1749-1809) of Bolam Hall in Northumberland, which he built (using stone from the ruined ancient castle on the site) on the estate purchased in 1727 by his father John Horsley. In accordance with the terms of his wife's inheritance he assumed the additional surname of Horsley in 1810. However, none of the subsequent barons have held this surname. His grandson, the fifth Baron, was a Major in the Army and also sat in the House of Lords as an Irish Representative Peer from 1912 to 1944.  the title is held by his grandson, the seventh Baron, who succeeded his father in 1992.

The family seat is Straffan Lodge, near Straffan, County Kildare.

Barons Decies (1812)
William Beresford, 1st Baron Decies (1743–1819)
John Horsley-Beresford, 2nd Baron Decies (1773–1855)
William Robert John Horsley-Beresford, 3rd Baron Decies (1811–1893)
William Marcus de la Poer Beresford, 4th Baron Decies (1865–1910)
John Graham Hope de la Poer Beresford, 5th Baron Decies (1866–1944)
Arthur George Marcus Douglas de la Poer Beresford, 6th Baron Decies,(1915–1992)
Marcus Hugh Tristram de la Poer Beresford, 7th Baron Decies (born 1948)

The heir apparent is the present holder's son Hon. Robert Marcus Duncan de la Poer Beresford (born 1988)

See also
Marquess of Waterford
Viscount Beresford
Baron Beresford

References

Links

Kidd, Charles, Williamson, David (editors). Debrett's Peerage and Baronetage (1990 edition). New York: St Martin's Press, 1990, 

Baronies in the Peerage of Ireland
Baron
Noble titles created in 1812